Mark Anthony Fish (born 14 March 1974) is a retired South African footballer who played as a defender.

Club career
Born in Cape Town, Fish started his career in his native South Africa under the guidance of renowned coach Steve Coetsee, playing for Arcadia Shepherds, an amateur team based at the Caledonian Stadium in Pretoria. He was spotted by then Jomo Cosmos coach Roy Matthews and turned professional as a striker. It was at Cosmos that he was converted into a left back and went on to become one of the most promising defenders in South Africa at the time.

In 1994 Fish was signed by Orlando Pirates after Cosmos were relegated. At Pirates he arguably played the best football of his career under the tutelage of Mike Makaab. He also won the league championship at Pirates, as well as the BP Top Eight Cup in 1994, the 1995 1995 African Champions League and the 1995 Bobsave Super Bowl (then the premier cup in South Africa). He captained The Buccaneers when they beat JS Kabylie in the 1996 CAF Super Cup. In the same year he was part of the history making South African national team to have won the African Cup of Nations at the first attempt after South Africa's readmission to FIFA in 1992.

Soon foreign scouts came knocking and he was signed by Lazio of Italy, after he turned down an opportunity to play for his boyhood club, Manchester United. However, he did move to England after just one season at Lazio to become the highest paid player at Bolton Wanderers. Fish was a mainstay in Bolton's back four for much of their first season back in the Premiership, he received praise from both teammates and those whom he played against, most notably Manchester United forward Andrew Cole. Despite Fish's efforts Bolton were relegated on the last day of the season despite having accumulated 40 points, normally enough to stave off the drop. Once playing back in the lower leagues Fish applied himself well, quickly gaining a cult status amongst the Bolton faithful, backed up by his nickname "Feesh", and a particularly eyecatching headgear in the shape of a giant Blue fish being made available in club stores. However, new suitors soon came calling, and only after the appointment of Sam Allardyce did Fish's star begin to fall in Lancashire. Fish soon followed his Danish teammate Claus Jensen and at Alan Curbishley's second time of asking moved to Charlton Athletic in a £700,000 move in November 2000. "The Big Fish" as he was affectionately known throughout his playing career went on to make 102 Premiership appearances for the Addicks, scoring three times.

In 2005, he began to fall out of favour at Charlton. He went on to have a very short loan spell (45 mins) at Ipswich Town in the 2005–06 season but a severe cruciate ligament injury led to Fish announcing his retirement.

Fish returned to football when he signed a six-month contract with his first club Jomo Cosmos in early 2007 but did not play an official game due to his low level of fitness.

International career
Internationally, Fish is best remembered as being a crucial part of South Africa's victorious national soccer squad when they won the 1996 African Cup of Nations. He scored one of the goals in the quarter final against Algeria. He was named to the Team of the Tournament in both the 1996 and 1998 African Cup of Nations. In total he won 62 caps for the South African national team, scoring twice.

He made his international debut in a friendly game against Mexico on 6 October 1993 and received his last cap in a World Cup qualifier against Ghana on 20 June 2004.

Career statistics

International

Scores and results list South Africa's goal tally first, score column indicates score after each Fish goal.

Personal life
He was married to Loui Fish (née Visser), a former lingerie model and well-known socialite. They have two sons, Luke Fish (born in Bolton, 1999) & Zeke Fish (born in 2001).

Fish returned from Europe to his homeland South Africa and has been actively involved in charity work, much of it aimed at the development of African soccer and the eradication of African poverty. He was one of a handful of Ambassadors in South Africa's successful bid to host the 2010 FIFA World Cup.

In August 2008 Fish's wife, Loui, and his ten-year-old son, Luke, were at their Mooikloof home with friends when five men, armed with an assortment of weapons including an AK-47, burst into their house.

Mark and Loui divorced in April 2011.

Mark later married his long time girlfriend Salomé Fish (née van Rensburg). Mark and Salomé divorced in December 2015. 
They have 2 children together: Isabella Fish (born 2010) and Blake Fish (born 2013).

Mark is currently an ANC member of the Lilliesfarm branch.

Further reading
 Graeme Friedman Madiba's Boys The Stories of Lucas Radebe and Mark Fish  Comerford & Miller, United Kingdom  Features a foreword by Nelson Mandela

References

External links
 

1997 FIFA Confederations Cup players
1998 FIFA World Cup players
1996 African Cup of Nations players
1998 African Cup of Nations players
2000 African Cup of Nations players
Africa Cup of Nations-winning players
Bolton Wanderers F.C. players
Charlton Athletic F.C. players
Expatriate footballers in Italy
Association football defenders
Ipswich Town F.C. players
Jomo Cosmos F.C. players
Orlando Pirates F.C. players
Soccer players from Pretoria
Premier League players
Serie A players
South Africa international soccer players
Expatriate footballers in England
South African expatriate sportspeople in England
South African expatriate sportspeople in Italy
South African expatriate soccer players
South African soccer players
S.S. Lazio players
1974 births
Living people
White South African people
South African people of British descent
Alumni of Pretoria Boys High School
Soccer players from Cape Town